Lawson Wilkins (1894-1963) was a pioneering pediatric endocrinologist. He is known along with John Money for pioneering surgeries for visibly intersex newborns.

Honors
Borden Award, American Academy of Pediatrics (1953)
Amory Prize, American Academy of Arts and Sciences (1955)
Koch Award, Endocrine Society (1961)
John Howland Award, American Pediatric Society (1963)

References

American pediatric endocrinologists
1894 births
1963 deaths